Tini (Martina Stoessel) (stylized as TINI (Martina Stoessel)) is the debut solo album by Argentine singer Tini, which also includes music from Tini: The Movie. The lead single from the album, "Siempre Brillarás", and its English version, "Born to Shine", were released on March 25, 2016. The album was available for pre-order from that date. It was released by Hollywood Records on April 29, 2016.

The album has received Gold certification in Argentina and sold over 100,000 copies worldwide in less than two months. The album reached number one in Argentina, as well as the top 10 in Italy, Germany, Austria and Poland.

Background and production 
Due to the worldwide success of the Argentine Disney Channel series Violetta, on August 21, 2015, it was revealed that Tini signed a recording contract with Hollywood Records to begin work on her first solo album. Following the conclusion of the international Violetta Live musical tour after the show's final season, Tini briefly relocated to Los Angeles to record her album with producers and songwriters over the course of three months, from January to March 2016.

On June 17, 2016, a version of the album containing the Spanish songs from the two discs and an additional track, a bilingual Spanish and English version of "Siempre Brillarás", was released.

On October 14, 2016, a deluxe edition of the album containing the songs from the first disc and two additional tracks, the Spanish versions of the respective songs "Great Escape" and "Got Me Started", "Yo Me Escaparé" (which had been already released as a single earlier) and "Ya No Hay Nadie Que Nos Pare" (featuring Colombian singer Sebastian Yatra), was released.

Promotion 
Two months after the album's release, on June 12 2016, Tini performed songs from the album at her first showcase as a solo artist at La Usina del Arte in Buenos Aires. The showcase was filmed and broadcast on Stoessel's official YouTube channel from August 22 till August 28. On July 24, Stoessel made an appearance on the Argentine show Susana Gimenéz where she performed "Great Escape" and "Siempre Brillarás" and was interviewed by Gimenéz. On August 17, Stoessel was interviewed for the Argentine radio station Radio La Red. On August 20, Stoessel did a charity concert for children to celebrate the Children's Day at Teatro Tango Porteño in Buenos Aires where she performed several songs from the album, as well as songs from Violetta. Italian singer, actor and Violetta co-star Ruggero made a special guest appearance during the concert. Stoessel was also set to do a second charity concert for children to celebrate Children's Day at Barrio 31 on August 21, but this was rescheduled to August 28. During the concert, Stoessel performed several songs from the album and Violetta soundtracks and with Pasquarelli again making an appearance. The concert was broadcast live. On June 25 2017, Stoessel appeared on Susana Gimenéz where she performed "Ya No Hay Nadie Que Nos Pare" alongside Colombian singer Sebastian Yatra. They also performed Yatra's hit single "Traicionera". In August 2017, Stoessel made a guest appearance in an episode of Disney Channel telenovela Soy Luna and performed the solo version of "Ya No Hay Nadie Que Nos Pare".

Singles 
"Siempre Brillarás" and its English version, "Born to Shine", were both released as the album's lead singles on March 25, 2016.

"Great Escape", as well as its Spanish version, "Yo Me Escaparé", was released on June 24 2016 as the second single from the album and Stoessel's first solo single.

"Got Me Started", as well as its Spanish version, "Ya No Hay Nadie Que Nos Pare" (featuring Sebastian Yatra), was released on October 14 2016, as the third single from the album to coincide with the release of the deluxe edition of the album.

The Spanish-language version of the song "My Stupid Heart", "Si Tu Te Vas", was released on May 4, 2017 as the fourth and final single from the album.

Music videos 
The music video for the first single from the album, "Siempre Brillarás", was released on March 25 2016. The English version, "Born to Shine", was released two weeks later, on April 8 2016.

On April 22 2016, a week before the album's release, the music video for "Light Your Heart", performed by Mexican singer and Violetta co-star Jorge Blanco, was released.

On April 29 2016, the day of the album's release, the music video for "Yo Te Amo a Ti", performed together by Tini and Jorge Blanco, was released.

On May 6 2016, the music video for "Losing the Love" was released.

On July 8 2016, the music video for "Great Escape" was released, featuring Spanish model Pepe Barroso Silva.

On December 8 2016, the music video for "Got Me Started" was released. The Spanish version, "Ya No Hay Nadie Que Nos Pare" (featuring Sebastian Yatra), was released on January 19 2017.

On May 4 2017, the music video for "Si Tu Te Vas" was released.

Track listing 

Notes
 signifies a vocal producer
 signifies an additional producer
 signifies a Spanish lyric translator

Charts and certifications

Weekly charts

Year-end charts

Certifications

See also 
 Got Me Started Tour
 2016 in Latin music
 List of number-one albums in Argentina

References 

2016 debut albums
Hollywood Records albums
Martina Stoessel albums
Spanish-language albums
Albums produced by Jason Evigan